Rudolf "Rudi" Müller (21 November 1920 – 21 October 1943) was a Luftwaffe fighter ace and recipient of the Knight's Cross of the Iron Cross during World War II. The Knight's Cross of the Iron Cross was awarded to recognize extreme battlefield bravery or successful military leadership. Müller was credited with 94 victories, though one source lists 101 victories.

Müller was born on 21 November 1920 in Frankfurt am Main.

World War II
When Müller first joined the German army he served with the signal corps. In 1940, he transferred to the Luftwaffe, and underwent pilot training. Müller was transferred to 1. Staffel (1st squadron) of Jagdgeschwader 77 (JG 77—77th Fighter Wing) in August of 1941. At the time, this squadron was commanded by Oberleutnant Horst Carganico. His first claimed victory came on 12 September 1941 when he shot down a Soviet Air Forces Polikarpov I-16 fighter.

In January 1942, Jagdgeschwader 5 (JG 5—5th Fighter Wing) was newly created and placed under the command of Oberst Carl-Alfred Schumacher. On 3 January, I. Gruppe of JG 77 was renamed and became the I. Gruppe of JG 5. In consequence, Carganico's 1. Staffel became the newly created 1. Staffel of JG 5. On 21 March, 1. Staffel was subordinated to II. Gruppe of JG 5, commanded by Strümpell, and became the 6. Staffel of JG 5. On 23 April 1942, he became an "ace-in-a-day". That day, 6. Staffel escorted Junkers Ju 87 dive bombers from I. Gruppe of Sturzkampfgeschwader 5 and Junkers Ju 88 bombers from Kampfgeschwader 30 on a bombing mission to the Soviet airfield at Vayenga, present-day Severomorsk. The flight was intercepted by Hawker Hurricane fighters from 3 AE/2 GvSAP (Aviation Squadron of Guards Composite Aviation Regiment—Aviatsionnya Eskadrilya; Gvardeskiy Smeshannyy Aviatsionnyy Polk). In this encounter, Müller shot down Serzhant Anatoliy Semyonov and Serzhant N. F. Yepanov. Returning to the airbase Petsamo-Luostari Airfield, 6. Staffel intercepted Soviet aircraft on a mission to bomb Petsamo-Luostari Airfield. In this aerial battle, Müller shot down two Hurricanes piloted by Starshiy Leytnant I. Ya and Serzhant A. I. Chibsov from 20 GvIAP (Guards Fighter Aviation Regiment—Gvardeskiy Istrebitelny Aviatsionny Polk), and a Tupolev SB bomber piloted by Mladshiy Leytenant Golovanov from 137 SBAP (High-Speed Bomber Aviation Regiment—Skorostnoy Bombardirovochnyy Aviatsionny Polk)

On 26 April, seven Petlyakov Pe-2 bombers, escorted by fighters from the 95 IAP (Fighter Aviation Regiment—Istrebitelny Aviatsionny Polk), attacked the Kirkenes Airfield. The attack force failed to inflict any damage to the airfield as five of the attackers were shot down, including two by Müller and two by Carganico. The Allied Convoy PQ 16, consisting of 35 merchant vessels headed from Hvalfjörður in Iceland to Murmansk from 21 to 30 May. At the same time, Convoy QP 12 with 15 freighters left Murmansk heading for Iceland. The convoys were sighted by German reconnaissance aircraft on 25 May 1942. Over the following five days, the convoys came under multiple attacks. On 30 May, JG 5 claimed 43 fighter aircraft and 7 bombers shot down. Matching these claims against Soviet records, the figures appear to be inflated. That morning at 09:20, Müller, Leutnant Heinrich Ehrler, Unteroffizier Hans Döbrich and another pilot each claimed a Hurricane fighter shot down. At the time and in the same area of this encounter, Podpolkovnik (lieutenant colonel) Boris Safonov, commander 2 GvSAP of the Soviet Naval Aviation, was shot down in his Curtiss P-40 Warhawk and killed in action.

On 13 June, Müller claimed three aerial victories over Hurricane fighters from 78 IAP, one of which was the 500th claim filed by II. Gruppe. Müller received the Knight's Cross of the Iron Cross on 19 June 1942 for 41 aerial victories. The presentation was made by Generaloberst Hans-Jürgen Stumpff at Petsamo, present-day Pechenga in Murmansk Oblast. By the end of September 1942, Müller was credited with 81 aircraft shot down. Müller injured his leg in a skiing accident in December that year, and after recovery was granted leave in Germany, returning to his unit in February 1943. On 8 March, Müller was carrying out a familiarisation flight on the new Messerschmitt Bf 109 G-2, which his Staffel was in the process of converting to, when the aircraft suffered an engine failure and crashed, with Müller suffering a concussion. He was shot down in his Messerschmitt Bf 109 G-2 (Werknummer 14810—factory number) by a Hurricane from 609 IAP on 19 April 1943 and was captured by Soviet forces. He was the highest-scoring German fighter pilot in the Arctic theatre at the time of his capture. Müller talked freely about himself and tactics during interrogation by his captors, and as a result was taken to nearby Soviet airfields to discuss fighter tactics with Soviet pilots before being sent to a Prisoner of War camp at Krasnogorsk, Moscow Oblast. On 21 October 1943 Müller was shot during an escape attempt while being moved to a camp in Mordovia.

Summary of career

Aerial victory claims
According to US historian David T. Zabecki, Müller was credited with 94 aerial victories. Spick also lists Müller with 94 aerial victories claimed in an unknown number of combat missions, all of which claimed on the Eastern Front. Mathews and Foreman, authors of Luftwaffe Aces — Biographies and Victory Claims, researched the German Federal Archives and states that Müller was credited with 94 aerial victories, plus one further unconfirmed claim. This figure includes 92 aerial victories on the Eastern Front and another two over the Western Allies.

Victory claims were logged to a map-reference (PQ = Planquadrat), for example "PQ 3078". These sectors were then subdivided into 36 smaller units to give a location area 3 × 4 km in size.

Awards
 Iron Cross (1939) 2nd and 1st Class
 Wound Badge in Black
 Front Flying Clasp of the Luftwaffe in Gold
 Honour Goblet of the Luftwaffe on 1 July 1942 as Unteroffizier and pilot
 German Cross in Gold on 27 May 1943 as Feldwebel in the 6./Jagdgeschwader 5
 Knight's Cross of the Iron Cross on 19 June 1942 as Feldwebel and pilot in the 6./Jagdgeschwader 5

Notes

References

Citations

Bibliography

 
 
 

 
 
 
 
 
 
 
 
 
 
 
 
 
 
 
 

1920 births
1943 deaths
Luftwaffe pilots
Luftwaffe personnel killed in World War II
Recipients of the Gold German Cross
Recipients of the Knight's Cross of the Iron Cross
Military personnel from Frankfurt
People from Hesse-Nassau
German prisoners of war in World War II held by the Soviet Union
German people who died in Soviet detention
Deaths by firearm in Russia